Moonfire is the debut studio album by the Australian indie rock band Boy & Bear. It was released on 5 August 2011 in the band's home country, with later release dates elsewhere. Recorded at Blackbird Studio in Nashville, Tennessee, with producer Joe Chiccarelli, the record garnered comparisons to other indie folk bands such as Fleet Foxes and Mumford & Sons.

Track listing
"Lordy May" – 3:33
"Feeding Line" – 4:28
"Milk & Sticks" – 4:42
"Part Time Believer" – 4:12 
"My Only One" – 5:48
"Percy Warner Park" – 1:03
"Golden Jubilee" – 3:17
"House & Farm" – 3:12
"The Village" – 1:35
"Beach" – 6:11
"Big Man" – 4:24

Charts

Weekly charts

Year-end charts

Decade-end charts

Certifications

References

2011 albums
ARIA Award-winning albums
Boy & Bear albums
Albums produced by Joe Chiccarelli